Manender Singh (born 2 January 1996) is an Indian cricketer who plays for Rajasthan. He made his first-class debut on 23 November 2015 in the 2015–16 Ranji Trophy. He made his Twenty20 debut on 2 January 2016 in the 2015–16 Syed Mushtaq Ali Trophy.

He was the leading run-scorer for Rajasthan in the 2018–19 Vijay Hazare Trophy, with 282 runs in five matches.

References

External links
 

1996 births
Living people
Indian cricketers
Rajasthan cricketers
Cricketers from Jaipur
Wicket-keepers